Arielle Greenberg (born 1972) is a feminist poet and the poetry editor of Black Clock. She named and described the concept of the Gurlesque in the anthology Gurlesque: the new grrly, grotesque, burlesque poetics, which she co-edited with Lara Glenum.

Biography
Greenberg was an assistant professor in the English Department at Columbia College Chicago.<ref name="ef">Wilkinson, Joshua Marie. Poets on Teaching: A Sourcebook. 307. eBook. https://books.google.com/books?hl=en&lr=&id=e2dLVe3p_loC&oi=fnd&pg=PA303&dq="arielle greenberg"&ots=rZhBIpAJXL&sig=8JTuN3Rnm93j_XH2f-K84TvQ_QI</ref> She is now living with her family in rural Maine. They are working on an oral history-style book on the back-to-the-land movement in that area.

Concept of The Gurlesque
"The words of the gurlesque  „luxuriate: they roll around in the sensual while avoiding the sharpness of overt messages, preferring the curve of sly mockery to theory or revelation‟. "

"The term Gurlesque comes from a combination of "1. The Carnivalesque. 2. The Burlesque. (and the Neo-Burlesque).3. The Riot Grrrls... Also, the Grotesque." " The term describes a very wide range of things and is a concept that even Greenberg has had trouble pinning down. Lara Glenum describes it in her introduction to Gurlesque as a kistchy, campy take on feminism. Gurlesque is an Avant Garde view of feminism which followed many of the same ideas of disrupting gender roles that allowed the Kinderwhore look and Riot Grrrl "movement" to take hold. Glenum and Greenberg both insist that, like the Riot Grrll "movement", Gurlesque poetics is "not a movement or a camp or a clique." The concept of the Gurlesque merely strings together a common strain that Greenberg noticed flowing through modern feminist poetry in the early 2000s.

Works
Books of Poetry
"Fa(r)ther Down: Songs from the Allergy Trials"
"Given"
"Locally Made Panties""My Kafka Century"
"Share Her""Slice"Non-Fiction Work
"Youth Subcultures: Exploring Underground America"

Editor of
"Home/Birth: A Poemic";
"Gurlesque: the new grrly, grotesque, burlesque poetics";
"Starting Today: 100 Poems for Obama’s First 100 Days";
"Women Poets on Mentorship: Efforts and Affections";
"Mirror-Fucation" and
"Mister Hay's Trippy Moebius".
"Pisacho''".

Greenberg currently lives in  Evanston, Illinois with her family.

References

Further reading
An Article written by Greenberg, based on an outline for a talk delivered at Small Press Traffic as part of the New Experiments series in November 2002.

1972 births
Living people
American feminist writers
American women poets
Columbia College Chicago faculty
21st-century American poets
21st-century American women writers
Writers from Columbus, Ohio
Poets from Ohio
American women academics